Birgit Offermann  (born 12 August 1960) is a German retired footballer. She was a member of the Germany women's national football team from 1982 to 1985. On club level she played for KBC Duisburg.

References

External links
 Profile at soccerdonna.de

1960 births
Living people
German women's footballers
Place of birth missing (living people)
Germany women's international footballers
Women's association football forwards